Crocus pallasii is a species of flowering plant in the genus Crocus of the family Iridaceae, found from the Balkan Peninsula to Israel and West Iran.

References

pallasii
Plants described in 1817
Flora of Lebanon